Ahmed Hasanović (born 6 February 2000) is a Bosnian professional footballer who plays as a forward for Croatian side Međimurje.

Club career
He has also played for Bosnian Premier League club Olimpik.

References

External links

2000 births
Living people
People from Fojnica
Association football forwards
Bosnia and Herzegovina footballers
Bosnia and Herzegovina youth international footballers
FK Sarajevo players
FK Goražde players
FK Olimpik players
NK Međimurje players
First League of the Federation of Bosnia and Herzegovina players
Premier League of Bosnia and Herzegovina players
First Football League (Croatia) players
Bosnia and Herzegovina expatriate footballers
Expatriate footballers in Croatia
Bosnia and Herzegovina expatriate sportspeople in Croatia